Bram Verhofstad (born February 3, 1995) is a Dutch artistic gymnast. He competed at the 2017 Artistic Gymnastics World Championships in October 2017 where he qualified to the floor exercise final. Bram also has a YouTube channel where he vlogs about many things.

References

External links 
 

1995 births
Dutch male artistic gymnasts
Living people
European Games competitors for the Netherlands
Gymnasts at the 2015 European Games
People from Leiderdorp
21st-century Dutch people